Blaženko Boban (born 27 August 1960) is a Croatian politician serving as Prefect of Split-Dalmatia County since 2017.

References

1960 births
Living people
Croatian Democratic Union MEPs
Politicians from Split, Croatia